Here is a list of episodes in Matt Lucas and David Walliams' comedy show Rock Profile.

Series one (1999–2000)

Series two (2000–2001)

Series three (2009)

Rock Profile episodes, List of